Chris Whitten (born 26 March 1959) is a British session drummer who provided drums for the hit singles "What I Am" by Edie Brickell & New Bohemians, "World Shut Your Mouth" by Julian Cope and "The Whole of the Moon" by the Waterboys. Two notable projects that Whitten was the drummer for were Paul McCartney's Flowers in the Dirt album in 1989, and Dire Straits’ final world tour from 1991–1992 to accompany their last studio album, On Every Street. In Italy he is well known for playing drums with Francesco De Gregori on some tracks of the album Titanic (1982), on eponymous album of Riccardo Cocciante, on album Yaya of Nino Buonocore and on single 45 rpm Uno su mille of Gianni Morandi. Whitten was also a member of the Catch, with Don Snow.

Whitten unusually has used a Noble & Cooley drum kit which are radically designed drums. The toms and snare are single-ply, steam-bent shells which give them (especially the snare) a distinctive sound. He has also recorded with such varied musicians as Tom Jones, Johnny Cash, the Pretenders, Swing Out Sister, ABC and the The and for Jean-Jacques Goldman for the Rouge album with Fredericks Goldman Jones.

Whitten has been an active participant and Honorary VIP Member of the Drummer Cafe community forum since 2003.

He is a specialist at drum sample production and has contributed drums and percussion with recording partner, the British engineer/producer Peter Henderson of Supertramp fame for the Toontrack drum sample libraries Custom and Vintage SDX and The Classic EZX, as well as several others.

He toured with The Dire Straits Experience and visited India to perform at a charity event in Gurgaon and Bangalore in March 2017.

References

External links
 Paul McCartney sessionography
 Chris Whitten Presents New Series - Behind the Drums
 The Classic EZX
 Custom & Vintage SDX

1959 births
Living people
English rock drummers
British male drummers
English session musicians
Edie Brickell & New Bohemians members
Paul McCartney Band members